Erythrolamprus janaleeae is a species of snake in the family Colubridae. The species is found in Peru.

References

Erythrolamprus
Reptiles of Peru
Endemic fauna of Peru
Reptiles described in 2000
Taxa named by James R. Dixon